A corned beef sandwich is a Jewish deli sandwich filled with corned beef, traditionally served with mustard and a pickle.

Variations
In the United Kingdom, the Jewish dish is known as a salt beef sandwich, and a corned beef sandwich refers to one made with canned corned beef, often served with  a sweet, vinegary pickled chutney such as Branston Pickle rather than mustard.

Another variant more common in the United States has sauerkraut, Swiss cheese, and Russian dressing on rye bread grilled and served hot is known as a Reuben sandwich.

A contraband corned beef sandwich on rye bread brought aboard the Gemini 3 spacecraft by John Young resulted in a minor controversy, for the risk posed to the craft and crew by floating crumbs and lingering odors.

See also

 American Jewish cuisine
 List of sandwiches
 Roast beef sandwich

References

External links

Jewish American cuisine
Ashkenazi Jewish cuisine
American cuisine
Israeli cuisine
Cuisine of New York City
Beef sandwiches
American sandwiches